Anoecia is a genus of aphids typical of the subfamily Anoeciinae.

Species
Species of this genus are mostly found in Eurasia and North America.
 Anoecia caricis Mordvilko, 1931
 Anoecia corni (Fabricius, 1775)
 Anoecia cornicola (Walsh, 1863)
 Anoecia cornimaris Bozhko, 1957
 Anoecia degenerifascia Qiao & Jinyu Yang, 2008
 Anoecia equiseti Halbert, 1991
 Anoecia fulviabdominalis (Sasaki 1899)
 Anoecia furcata (Theobald, 1915)
 Anoecia graminis Gillette & M.A. Palmer, 1924
 Anoecia haupti Börner, 1950
 Anoecia himalayensis Chakrabarti, Samiran & Maity, 1978
 Anoecia ilicicola Sorin, 1999
 Anoecia japonica Sorin, 1999
 Anoecia krizusi (Börner, 1950)
 Anoecia major Börner, 1950
 Anoecia mimeuri Börner, 1950
 Anoecia mirae Narzikulov, 1968
 Anoecia oenotherae H.F. Wilson, 1911
 Anoecia panici (C.Thomas, 1878)
 Anoecia pskovica Mordvilko, 1921
 Anoecia radiciphaga Pal & D.N. Raychaudhuri, 1977
 Anoecia setariae Gillette & M.A. Palmer, 1924
 Anoecia similiradiciphaga Qiao & Jiang, 2008
 Anoecia stipae Mamontova, 1968
 Anoecia takahashii Sorin, 1999
 Anoecia tanakai Sorin, 1999
 Anoecia vagans (C.L. Koch, 1856)
 Anoecia willcocksi F.V. Theobald, 1915
 Anoecia zirnitsi Mordvilko, 1931

References

Aphididae